Fox (stylised as FOX) was a British pay television channel serving the United Kingdom and Ireland, owned by Fox Networks Group, a unit of Disney International Operations. It launched on 12 January 2004 as FX289, then changed its name to FX in April 2005 (similar to the American FX), and rebranded to FOX in January 2013. Featuring a mix of comedies and drama series, the channel's programming targeted adults from 18 to 35 years old.

It was announced on 17 May 2021 that Fox would cease broadcasting in the UK and Ireland on 1 July 2021. Most of its content was moved to Star on Disney+. The channel ceased broadcasting as planned on that day.

History

FX289 (2004–05)
The channel launched on 12 January 2004 branded as FX289, in reference to its Sky EPG number. In its early years, it mainly broadcast films from the 20th Century Studios library.

FX (2005–2013)
The channel was rebranded as FX as it moved in the Sky EPG on 21 April 2005. As FX, the channel targeted a demographic of mainly males. Unlike its American counterpart, it promoted and aired both Fox-produced and non-Fox-produced shows. It had a similar format to its American sister channel, with a schedule consisting largely of Fox-produced shows, including comedies such as Arrested Development, Family Guy, American Dad! and King of the Hill, and dramas such as Millennium, The Shield, The X-Files,  and NYPD Blue. Non-Fox-produced shows rerun or receiving their UK premiere on the channel include The Walking Dead, Falling Skies, Babylon 5, Carnivàle, Highlander, JAG, NCIS, Sleeper Cell, E-Ring and Huff, Nip/Tuck, Generation Kill, True Blood, Mob City and Dexter. The channel also produced original content such as the sketch show No Signal!

Fox (2013–2021)
FX was rebranded as Fox at  GMT on 11 January 2013 with the beginning of the tenth season of NCIS. With this change, the target demographic switched to both men and women aged between 18 and 35 years old. New programmes added to the schedule included Louie, The Ricki Lake Show, Men at Work, Da Vinci's Demons and the second season of The Increasingly Poor Decisions of Todd Margaret, while many of the programmes that featured on FX continued to broadcast such as The Walking Dead, Dexter, True Blood, Falling Skies, Family Guy, and NCIS. Fox also planned to commission up to 50 hours of original UK content by the end of the year, expecting to spend between £5m and £10m.

Fox was removed from the BT YouView platform on 1 March 2016. BT stated in an e-mail to customers that Fox had "changed the way they offer their TV channels to TV providers." Following Disney's acquisition of 21st Century Fox, including Fox Networks Group International, the channel falls under ultimate ownership of Walt Disney Direct-to-Consumer and International.

In February 2019, the channel rebranded for the first time in more than four years. The rebrand included a new on-air identity which is more modern compared to earlier logos and idents.

Closure
On 17 May 2021, Disney announced that Fox would be closing at the end of June, with all of the channel's content moving to Star hub of Disney+. "On 30 June, the Fox channel in the UK will close," announced a spokesperson for the broadcaster. "Many titles will become available on Star on Disney+ and will be announced in the near future. We appreciate the support of our UK fans and can't wait to keep sharing the best stories with you. Star on Disney+ serves as the home of movies and television from Disney's creative studios, including Disney Television Studios (20th Television and ABC Signature), FX Productions and 20th Century Studios."

The channel closed on 1 July 2021, with its website redirecting to Disney+. The final programme that was scheduled to be shown on Fox was The Republic of Doyle, season 5, episode 12: "Sleight of Hand" at 4:00 to 5:00am on Fox HD/SD and from 5:00 to 6:00am on Fox +1. One hour of teleshopping was broadcast on each channel before a screen card stating the channel had closed was shown, though the teleshopping was not on the EPG listings on Fox +1.

On Sky, Fox was on channel 124. On 1 July 2021, after Fox's closure, Sky Nature was moved from channel 130 to channel 124. Its secondary channel was not moved, which remained on channel 893.

Timeshift
Fox operated a one-hour timeshift named Fox +1. The channel originally launched as a two-hour timeshift service, as FX +, and was joined on Sky by FX +1 on 10 December 2007. The branding of sister timeshift channel FX + had not been changed to reflect this, causing confusion due to the two being very similar in name (FX +, FX +1), with viewers assuming a mistake or a double-over of the channel.

On Monday 28 April 2008, FX +1 ceased broadcasting and its slot was replaced with FX HD. On 1 September 2008, to coincide with Sky's EPG reshuffle, FX + became a 1-hour timeshift. The channel was rebranded as Fox + on 11 January 2013, in line with the main channel. The channel was renamed to Fox +1 on 18 March 2017. (The channel's former name, Fox +, is not to be confused with the Latin American group of premium channels later known as Fox Premium, which used the name "Fox+" from 3 November 2014 until they were rebranded to the later name on 11 March 2017.)

Fox HD
Fox HD was a high definition simulcast of the channel, which launched on Monday 28 April 2008 at 10:00pm as FX HD. It initially broadcast a completely separate schedule from the standard definition channel, with only HD content and without ads.

FX HD was originally due to launch on 21 April 2008, but as stated on the FX Forums the date was pushed back to 28 April 2008 due to "technical problems at the transmission end".

On 24 April 2009, FX HD became a simulcast of FX, broadcasting HD content when possible but only broadcasting between 7:00pm and 2:00am every day. On 5 January 2010, FX HD increased its broadcast hours to match its SD counterpart.

The channel also joined Virgin Media's digital cable TV lineup on channel 158 on 30 July 2009.

The channel was rebranded as Fox HD on 11 January 2013, in line with the main channel.

Funny As Fox 
Similar to Fox's Animation Domination in America. Funny as Fox was a programming block which aired shows similarly to its American counterpart, such as Family Guy and American Dad! (both now shown on ITV2). The block name was the same as Fox's slogan. Funny As Fox used to air People Of Earth until late 2019.

Funny As Fox aired, on some days, from 9pm to 4am. This was regularly not the case as some premieres shown on Fox were shown around 9pm to 11pm so the block normally aired from 11pm to 4am. The main slogan for the block was 'Late Night, Every Night... Literally!.'.

Programming
As well as British and American programming, the channel has aired a number of international programmes. These include Last Man Standing and The Nominees from Australia; Jo from France; Charlie Jade, a co-production between Canada and South Africa; and the Flemish series Matrioshki, which was shown with subtitles.

Original content has also aired on the channel, including No Signal! which aired from February to April 2009.

For several weeks from 5 December 2005, FX carried a strand of programming from the Fox-owned American channel Fuel TV. The strand was identified as FX Presents Fuel TV, and made use of Fuel TV's US branding graphics. In August 2015, Fox announced that a variety of Adult Swim programming would air on the channel including adult animated sci-fi comedy Rick and Morty, starting Thursday, 10 September of that year. On 10 September 2015, Adult Swim moved to Fox along with truTV, airing Rick and Morty and Mr. Pickles as its first day line up. As of 2016, it aired on Fridays from Midnight to 1:00 a.m.

Final programming
American Dad! (also on ITV2)  (April 2005 – June 2021)
American Horror Story
APB
Atlanta (also on BBC Two)
Bless This Mess
Bones
Bull (also on Sky Witness)
Damien
Family Guy (also on ITV2)  (January 2005 – June 2021)
Gang Related
L.A.'s Finest
Mr Inbetween
NCIS (also on 5USA & CBS Justice)
NCIS: New Orleans (also on 5USA)
Next
Outmatched
Republic of Doyle
Talking Dead
The Family
The Fix
The Grinder
The Mentalist
The Orville
The Walking Dead
Those Who Kill
War of the Worlds (Series 1 only)

Former programming
11.22.63
24: Legacy
Aqua Teen Hunger Force
Baskets
Body of Proof
Braquo
Brockmire
Buffy the Vampire Slayer (now on E4)
Burn Notice
Constantine
Cops
Da Vinci's Demons
Deep State
Dexter (now on Sky Atlantic)
Dream Corp LLC
Emergence
Falling Skies
False Flag
Huff
King of the Hill
Law & Order: Criminal Intent
Legion
Leverage
Louie
Low Winter Sun
Lucifer
Marvel's Agent Carter
Medium
Minority Report
Monk
Murder in the First
No Signal!
Outcast
People of Earth
Perfect Harmony
Prison Break
Rick and Morty (now airs on E4)
Shots Fired
Stan Against Evil
The Cleveland Show (now airs on Comedy Central and ITV2)
The Closer
The Gifted
The Passage
The Venture Bros.
Tim & Eric's Bedtime Stories
True Blood
Tyrant
Wayward Pines
Wolf Creek
Your Pretty Face is Going to Hell

References

UK and Ireland
Disney television channels in the United Kingdom
Television channels and stations established in 2004
Television channels and stations disestablished in 2021
English-language television stations in the United Kingdom
2004 establishments in the United Kingdom
2021 disestablishments in the United Kingdom
Defunct television channels in the United Kingdom
Former subsidiaries of The Walt Disney Company